Não Me Digas Adeus is a 1947 Argentine-Brazilian romantic musical film directed by Luis Moglia Barth. The film was shot in Petrópolis, Rio de Janeiro (state).

Cast
Linda Batista 		
Lourdinha Bittencourt 
Luiz Bonfá 
Moraes Cardoso 		
Darcy Cazarré		
Older Cazarré 	
Hugo Chemin 	
Manuel Collado 		
Pablo Cumo 		
Regina Célia 		
Nelly Darén 			
Luz del Fuego 			
Anselmo Duarte 			
Josefina Díaz 		
Oswaldo de Moraes Eboli

References

External links
 

1947 films
Films directed by Luis Moglia Barth
1940s romantic musical films
Argentine romantic musical films
Films shot in Rio de Janeiro (state)
Brazilian black-and-white films
Argentine black-and-white films
1940s Argentine films